The 1970 edition of the Campeonato Carioca kicked off on June 27, 1970 and ended on September 20, 1970. It was organized by FCF (Federação Carioca de Futebol, or Carioca Football Federation). Twelve teams participated. Vasco da Gama won the title for the 13th time. no teams were relegated.

System
The tournament would be divided in two stages:
 First round: The twelve teams all played in a single round-robin format against each other. The eight best teams qualified to the Second round.
 Final phase: The remaining eight teams all played in a single round-robin format against each other. The team with the most points won the title.

Championship

First round

Final round

Taça Guanabara

First phase

Group A

Group B

Second phase

Group A

Group B

Third phase

References

Campeonato Carioca seasons
Carioca